The title Viscount Trematon has been created twice, once in the Peerage of Great Britain, and once in the Peerage of the United Kingdom.

 in 1726 as a subsidiary title of the Duke of Cumberland
 in 1917 as a subsidiary title of the Earl of Athlone

Extinct viscountcies in the Peerage of Great Britain
Extinct viscountcies in the Peerage of the United Kingdom
Noble titles created in 1726
Noble titles created in 1917